Pablo da San Leocadio or Paolo da Reggio (10 September 1447 – c. 1520) was an Italian  painter from Reggio Emilia,  who was mostly active in Spain.

Biography
In the 1450s or 1460 he moved to Ferrara, where he was influenced by local painters such as Bono da Ferrara and Ercole de' Roberti. In 1472 he sailed from Ostia to Valencia, for Cardinal Rodrigo Borgia, the future Pope Alexander VI.

He painted, in 1506, in conjunction with Francesco Pagano, the doors of the high altar of the cathedral of Valencia, with subjects from the Life of the Virgin. His other works include a Virgin of the Grace in the church of  San Miguel at Enguera (province of Valencia), a St. Michael in the Diocesan Museum of Valencia, the Virgin of the Knight of Montesa in the Museo del Prado of Madrid and the Holy Conversation in the National Gallery, London.

See also
Route of the Borgias

References
Danilo Morini, Giovanni Pio Palazzi, Benedetto Morini – Un pittore reggiano in Spagna – Paolo da San Leocadio; da Reggio Storia n° 114, Reggio Emilia 2007
Ximo Company i Climent – Paolo da San Leocadio i els inicis de la pintura del Reinaixement a Espanya, Gandia 2007.
Ximo Company, Il Rinascimento di Paolo da San Leocadio, Palermo, Gruppo editoriale Kalos, 2009

Attribution:

External links

 Historia de los Frescos de la Catedral

1447 births
1520s deaths
People from Reggio Emilia
Italian Renaissance painters
15th-century Italian painters
Italian male painters
16th-century Italian painters